Conus dampierensis is a species of sea snail, a marine gastropod mollusk in the family Conidae, the cone snails and their allies.

Like all species within the genus Conus, these snails are predatory and venomous. They are capable of "stinging" humans, therefore live ones should be handled carefully or not at all.

Description
The size of a shell varies between 23 mm and 34 mm.

The Color of the shell is a cream orange color with white blotches that are scattered throughout the shell. the tip of the shell is pointed instead of flat which some members of its genus have. Like all members of its genus Conus Dampierensis's shell is in a cone shape.

Distribution
This marine species is endemic to Australia and occurs off Western Australia.

References

 Coomans, H.E. & Filmer, R.M. 1985. Studies of Conidae (Mollusca, Gastropoda) 1. Conus papuensis and C. kintoki, two new species from the deeper water in the western Pacific. Beaufortia 35(81): 1–14
 Wilson, B. 1994. Australian Marine Shells. Prosobranch Gastropods. Kallaroo, WA : Odyssey Publishing Vol. 2 370 pp.
 Röckel, D., Korn, W. & Kohn, A.J. 1995. Manual of the Living Conidae. Volume 1: Indo-Pacific Region. Wiesbaden : Hemmen 517 pp.
 Tucker J.K. & Tenorio M.J. (2009) Systematic classification of Recent and fossil conoidean gastropods. Hackenheim: Conchbooks. 296 pp
 Puillandre N., Duda T.F., Meyer C., Olivera B.M. & Bouchet P. (2015). One, four or 100 genera? A new classification of the cone snails. Journal of Molluscan Studies. 81: 1–23

External links
 The Conus Biodiversity website
 Cone Shells – Knights of the Sea
 

dampierensis
Gastropods described in 1985
Gastropods of Australia